The Praise of Mahākāla is a Mongolian Buddhist poem written in the Mongolian script by an Oirat or Uyghur scholar of the Sakya school, Choiji Odser (chos kyi 'od gser).

The poem is one of the many manuscripts found at Turfan. It dates from around 1305 and shows evidence of woodblock printing during that time. The poem is written in traditional Mongolian poetical style and rhyme such as that found in The Secret History of the Mongols and provides a valuable insight into Middle Mongol.

Choiji Odser
Choiji Odser (1260–1320), whose name may be translated as "Light of the Dharma", was a famous scholar during the early Yuan dynasty who played a major role in standardizing the Mongolian language and script. He produced the first work on Mongolian grammar in 1305 and translated many works from Sanskrit and Tibetan. There is a great deal of information about him in Mongolian, Chinese and Tibetan sources. He was the guru and spiritual advisor to Külüg Khan, who was the Yuan emperor. In the 24th book of the History of Yuan, his erudition is praised and it is written that he was awarded ten thousand paper money notes. Only the 12 last pages remain from his ten chapter Commentary on the Bodhisattvacaryāvatāra (also found at Turpan) and it is written at the end of this same work that he had one thousand copies printed at the Miaoying Temple in Khanbaliq (now Beijing) in 1312.

The original text in Mongolian (modernized pronunciation)

References 

 Picture of manuscript (lines 1-20), The Berlin-Brandenburg Academy of Sciences and Humanities.
Ts. Damdinsuren. Mongolin uran zohiolin deej zuun bilig orshvai. Ulaanbaatar, 1958.

Mongolian literature